Pattern Energy Group LP  is an American company that develops, owns and operates utility scale wind and solar power facilities in the United States, Canada, Japan, and Mexico. It is headquartered in San Francisco, California with an operations center in Houston, Texas.

History 
Pattern Energy was organized in 2009 by Riverstone Holdings to acquire assets from Babcock & Brown's North American wind energy group. In 2013 the company sold operating assets to Pattern Energy Group Inc. following that company's initial public offering (IPO). The development assets of Pattern Energy were retained by a privately held entity.

On March 16, 2020, Pattern Energy Group Inc. was acquired by Canada Pension Plan Investment Board (CPPIB) and taken private through a reverse merger transaction. In connection with the going private transaction, Pattern Energy Group LP acquired 28 renewable energy facilities from Pattern Energy Group Inc. with an aggregate operating capacity of 4.4 gigawatts. As of November 2022 the company's aggregate installed operating capacity was 5.9 gigawatts. 

In July 2022, Pattern Energy acquired the SunZia Transmission line project from SouthWestern Power Group, through private funding.

Facilities 
As of November 2022, Pattern Energy owns and/or operates the following operational energy generation facilities:

United States 

 Amazon Wind Farm (Fowler Ridge), Benton County, Indiana, United States
 Broadview Wind, Curry County, New Mexico, United States
 Gulf Wind in Kenedy County, Texas, United States
 Grady Wind, Curry County, New Mexico, United States
 Hatchet Ridge Wind in Burney, California, United States
 Logan's Gap Wind, Comanche County, Texas, United States
 Lost Creek Wind, DeKalb County, Missouri, United States
 Ocotillo Wind in Ocotillo, California, United States
 Panhandle Wind, Carson County, Texas, United States
 Panhandle 2 Wind, Carson County, Texas, United States
 Phoenix Solar, Fannin County, Texas, United States
 Post Rock Wind, Ellsworth and Lincoln Counties, Kansas, United States
 Santa Isabel Wind in Santa Isabel, Puerto Rico

 Stillwater Wind, Stillwater County, Montana, United States
 Western Spirit Wind, Guadalupe, Lincoln and Torrance counties, New Mexico

Canada 

 Armow Wind, Kincardine, Ontario, Canada
 Belle River Wind, Lakeshore, Ontario, Canada
 Grand Renewable Wind, Haldimand County, Ontario, Canada
 Henvey Inlet Wind, Henvey Inlet First Nation Reserve No. 2 Lands, Ontario, Canada
 K2 Wind, Ashfield-Colborne-Wawanosh, Ontario, Canada
 Meikle Wind, Peace River Regional District, British Columbia, Canada
 Mont Sainte Marguerite Wind, Chaudière-Appalaches region, Quebec, Canada
 North Kent Wind, Ontario, Canada
 South Kent Wind in South Kent, Ontario, Canada
 St. Joseph Wind in St. Joseph, Manitoba, Canada

Japan 

 Futtsu Solar, Chiba Prefecture, Japan
 Kanagi Solar, Shimane Prefecture, Japan
 Ohorayama Wind, Kochi Prefecture, Japan
 Otsuki Wind, Kochi Prefecture, Japan
 Tsugaru Wind, Aomori Prefecture, Japan

Mexico 

 Helios Solar, Mazapil Municipality, Zacatecas, Mexico
 Tuli Solar, Mazapil Municipality, Zacatecas, Mexico

References

External links 

Wind power companies of the United States
Solar energy companies of the United States
Energy companies established in 2009
Renewable resource companies established in 2009
2009 establishments in California
Companies based in San Francisco
Companies formerly listed on the Nasdaq
CPP Investment Board companies
2013 initial public offerings
2020 mergers and acquisitions
American companies established in 2009